Leonidas J. Skyrianidis served as the Headquarters Commissioner of the Scouts of Greece.

In 1974, Skyrianidis was awarded the 90th Bronze Wolf, the only distinction of the World Organization of the Scout Movement, awarded by the World Scout Committee for exceptional services to world Scouting.

References

External links

Recipients of the Bronze Wolf Award
Year of birth missing
Scouting and Guiding in Greece
World Scout Committee members
Possibly living people